Brno-Jehnice is a district of the city of Brno in the Czech Republic. Originally, it was an independent village called Jehnice. It became a part of Brno in 1971. Its cadastral territory has an area of 4.07 km² and approximately 1,100 inhabitants live here.

The first possible mention of Jehnice dates from 1292, in the following centuries the village belonged mainly to the Lichtenburgs and mainly to the Boskovices. Their property was acquired by the Liechtenstein family at the beginning of the 17th century. A part of the village has been a free manor since the Middle Ages, which was also purchased by the Lichtensteins at the end of the 18th century. In 1801, a small independent estate was created from Jehnice and Mokrá Hora, gradually with different owners. From the middle of the 19th century, Jehnice was an independent municipality, and in 1971 it became part of Brno. At the turn of the 20th and 21st centuries, a more extensive suburban development arose here.

Due to its forest character, the Jehnice area is used as a tourist and recreational facility for the residents of Brno. On the road to Vranov there is a listed church of God's torment, right in the village there is a bell tower and several other sights.

References

External links
 Official website
 Jehnice at Encyklopedie dějin města Brna

Brno